Orthopteroseius is a genus of mites in the family Otopheidomenidae. There is at least one described species in Orthopteroseius, O. sinicus.

References

Mesostigmata
Articles created by Qbugbot